M1892 may refer to:

 Colt M1892, a revolver used by the U.S. military
 Springfield Model 1892–99, a rifle used by the U.S. Army
 Modèle 1892 revolver, a French revolver